Hubert Augustus Caldwell (December 26, 1907 – August 9, 1972) was an American athlete who competed in Men's Crew.

He was in the University of California, Berkeley class of 1929 and a member of the California-Alpha Sigma Phi Epsilon fraternity.  An oars-man for his university's crew team, he competed in the 1928 Olympics in Amersterdam for which the team brought back gold medals.  He was a member of the US National Championship Crew Team that year.

References

External links
 
 
 
 

1907 births
1972 deaths
Olympic gold medalists for the United States in rowing
Rowers at the 1928 Summer Olympics
American male rowers
Medalists at the 1928 Summer Olympics
University of California, Berkeley alumni